Danielle Émilienne Isabelle Mitterrand (née Gouze; 29 October 1924 – 22 November 2011) was the wife of French President François Mitterrand, and president of the foundation France Libertés Fondation Danielle Mitterrand.

Biography 
Danielle Émilienne Isabelle Gouze was born on 29 October 1924 in Verdun, in the Meuse. Her father, Antoine Gouze (1885-1958), was a college principal. Her mother, born Renée Flachot (1890-1971), was a teacher.  Her parents were secularists, Republicans and French Section of the Workers' International (SFIO) activists. In 1940, Antoine Gouze refused to list, as he was asked, the Jewish students and teachers of his college and was dismissed by the Vichy government. He then moved to Cluny where he gave private lessons.

During the years 1940–1942, her family regularly housed in hiding members of the Resistance Combat network, including its leader, Henri Frenay.

Background
When she was seventeen years old, her family (her parents were teachers) aided the French Resistance and helped lodge men of the Maquis (French Resistance), and she became a liaison officer in the Resistance. She met François Mitterrand there, and married him three months after the Liberation, on 28 October 1944.

She created the France-Libertés Foundation in 1986, when she was First Lady, with the fusion of three smaller associations which had been established in 1981. In 1996 Mitterrand was one of the winners of the North–South Prize.

Mitterrand had three sons: Pascal (who died in childhood), Jean-Christophe and Gilbert Mitterrand.

Opinions
Mitterrand was a longtime supporter of Cuba and its Marxist–Leninist government. However, during Fidel Castro's 1995 visit to France, she also helped secure the release of imprisoned Cuban dissident Yndamiro Restano Díaz, who was reportedly freed at her request. She was also a supporter of the ANC and the anti apartheid movement in South Africa.

She also supported the  Sandinistas when her husband gave them military aid in their war against US-backed forces in Nicaragua. She was very critical of Turkey, opposing its accession to the European Union and supportive of the Kurdistan independence movement. She voiced her views in favour of Sahrawi separatists, Mexican insurgent Subcomandante Marcos, and the Tibetan people, among others.

As First Lady, she spoke out against human rights violations, including in countries with which the French government was seeking to maintain good relations; she earned the ire both of the Chinese government and of King Hassan II of Morocco, in particular. Her France-Libertés Foundation provided financial support to local human rights initiatives abroad, and also financed access to medicine and education in poor countries.

She supported a "no" vote in the 2005 French referendum on the European Constitution: "I denounce the power of the economy over people, a system that turns individuals into elements in an economic equation, does not respect the poor and excludes everyone that does not live up to the principle of profitability".

Works
 These men are first our brothers (Ces hommes sont avant tout nos frères), Ramsay, 1996, on the Indians of Chiapas
 Torture in Tunisia: Committee for freedom and human rights in Tunisia (La torture en Tunisie : Comité pour le respect des libertés et des droits de l’homme en Tunisie), Le temps des cerises, 2000

Honours 

The French International School MLF Danielle Mitterrand in Iraqi Kurdistan is named after her.

Foreign honours 
  : Grand Cross of the Order of the Crown (1991)
  : Order of Gabriela Silang (11 July 1989)
  : Commander Grand Cross of the Order of the Polar Star (11 May 1984)

References

External links

 France Libertés Fondation Danielle Mitterrand 

French activists
French women activists
.
Spouses of French presidents
1924 births
2011 deaths
Female resistance members of World War II
French Resistance members
People from Verdun
Tibet freedom activists

Grand Crosses of the Order of the Crown (Netherlands)
Commanders Grand Cross of the Order of the Polar Star
20th-century French politicians
21st-century French politicians
French women in World War II
20th-century French women
Mitterrand family